The Honor 6 Plus is a flagship Android smartphone produced by Honor, when it was still a sub brand of Huawei.

Specifications
The phone has 3 GB RAM, it has 16GB or 32GB of internal storage and is connectable using Bluetooth 4.0, Wifi 802.11 a/b/g/n and 2G/3G/4GLTE. It was released in December 2014.

Honor 6 Plus has a 5.5-inch IPS LCD display and runs on Android 6 OS after the latest update. It uses the HiSilicon Kirin 925 (28 nm) chipset.

References

 https://www.hihonor.com/global/products/smartphone/honor6-plus/
 https://www.techradar.com/reviews/phones/mobile-phones/honor-6-plus-1279376/review
 https://www.phonearena.com/phones/Honor-6-Plus_id9010
https://www.gsmarena.com/honor_6_plus-6777.php

Android (operating system) devices
Mobile phones introduced in 2014
Huawei mobile phones
Discontinued smartphones
Mobile phones with infrared transmitter